This is a list of the 50 spacecraft missions (including unsuccessful ones) relating to the planet Mars, such as orbiters and rovers.

Missions

Mission Type Legend

Mars landing locations 

In 1999, Mars Climate Orbiter accidentally entered Mars' atmosphere and either burnt up or left Mars' orbit on an unknown trajectory.

There are a number of derelict spacecraft orbiting Mars whose location is not known precisely. There is a proposal to use the Optical Navigation Camera on the Mars Reconnaissance Orbiter to search for small moons, dust rings and old orbiters. As of 2016, there were believed to be eight derelict spacecraft in orbit around Mars (barring unforeseen event). The Viking 1 orbiter was not expected to decay until at least 2019. Mariner 9, which entered Mars orbit in 1971, was expected to remain in orbit until approximately 2022, when it was projected to enter the Martian atmosphere and either burn up, or crash into the planet's surface.

Timeline

Future missions

In development

Proposals

Missions to the moons of Mars

There have also have been proposed missions dedicated to explore the two moons of Mars, Phobos and Deimos. Many missions to Mars have also included dedicated observations of the moons, while this section is about missions focused solely on them. There have been three unsuccessful dedicated missions and many proposals. Because of the proximity of the Mars moons to Mars, any mission to them may also be considered a mission to Mars from some perspectives.

There have been at least three proposals in the United States Discovery Program, including PADME, PANDORA, and MERLIN. The ESA has also considered a sample return mission, one of the latest known as Martian Moon Sample Return or MMSR, and it may use heritage from an asteroid sample return mission.

In Japan, the Institute of Space and Astronautical Science (ISAS) is developing a sample return mission to Phobos, due to launch in 2024. This mission is called Martian Moons Exploration (MMX) and is proposed as a flagship Strategic Large Mission.  MMX will build on the expertise the Japan Aerospace Exploration Agency (JAXA) would gain through the Hayabusa2 and SLIM missions. As of January 2018, MMX is set for launch in September 2024.

Three missions to land on Phobos have been launched; the Phobos program in the late 1980s saw the launch of Fobos 1 and Fobos 2, while the Fobos-Grunt sample return mission was launched in 2011. None of these missions were successful: Fobos 1 failed en route to Mars, Fobos 2 failed shortly before landing, and Fobos-Grunt never left low Earth orbit.

Missions sent to the Martian system have returned data on Phobos and Deimos and missions specifically dedicated to the moons are a subset of missions Mars that often include dedicated goals to acquire data about these moons. An example of this is the imaging campaigns by Mars Express of the Mars moons.

Osiris-Rex 2 was a proposal to make OR a double mission, with the other one collecting samples from the two Mars moons. In 2012, it was stated that this mission would be both the quickest and least expensive way to get samples from the Moons.

The 'Red Rocks Project', a part of Lockheed Martin's "Stepping stones to Mars" program,  proposed to explore Mars robotically from Deimos.

Mars Missions by Organization/Company

Unrealized concepts
examples only

1970s 
 Mars 4NM and Mars 5NM – projects intended by the Soviet Union for heavy Marsokhod (in 1973 according to initial plan of 1970) and Mars sample return (planned for 1975). The missions were to be launched on the failed N1 rocket.
 Mars 5M (Mars-79) – double-launching Soviet sample return mission planned to 1979 but cancelled due to complexity and technical problems
 Voyager-Mars – USA, 1970s – Two orbiters and two landers, launched by a single Saturn V rocket.

1990s 
 Vesta – the multiaimed Soviet mission, developed in cooperation with European countries for realisation in 1991–1994 but canceled due to the Soviet Union disbanding, included the flyby of Mars with delivering the aerostat and small landers or penetrators followed by flybys of 1 Ceres or 4 Vesta and some other asteroids with impact of penetrator on the one of them.
 Mars Aerostat – Russian/French balloon part for cancelled Vesta mission and then for failed Mars 96 mission, originally planned for the 1992 launch window, postponed to 1994 and then to 1996 before being cancelled.
 Mars Together, combined U.S. and Russian mission study in the 1990s. To be launched by a Molinya with possible U.S. orbiter or lander.
 Mars Environmental Survey – set of 16 landers planned for 1999–2009
 Mars-98 – Russian mission including an orbiter, lander, and rover, planned for 1998 launch opportunity as repeat of failed Mars 96 mission; cancelled due to lack of funding

2000s 
 Mars Surveyor 2001 Lander – October 2001 – Mars lander (refurbished, became Phoenix lander)
 Kitty Hawk – Mars airplane micromission, proposed for 17 December 2003, the centennial of the Wright brothers' first flight.  Its funding was eventually given to the 2003 Mars Network project.
 NetLander – 2007 or 2009 – Mars netlanders
 Beagle 3 – 2009 British lander mission meant to search for life, past or present.
 Mars Telecommunications Orbiter – September 2009 – Mars orbiter for telecommunications

2010s 
 Mars One - announced in 2012, planned to land a demo lander on Mars by 2016, with a crewed landing to follow by 2023. These dates were delayed multiple times, and the project was eventually cancelled, with the company going bankrupt in 2019
 Sky-Sailor – 2014 – Plane developed by Switzerland to take detailed pictures of Mars surface
 Mars Astrobiology Explorer-Cacher – 2018 rover concept, cancelled due to budget cuts in 2011. Sample cache goal later moved to Mars 2020 rover.
 Red Dragon – Derivative of a Dragon 2 capsule by SpaceX, designed to land by aerobraking and retropropulsion. Planned for 2018, then 2020. Canceled in favor of the Starship system.
 Tumbleweed rover, wind-propelled sphere

See also

 Artificial objects on Mars
 Comparison of embedded computer systems on board the Mars rovers
 Exploration of Mars
 Human mission to Mars
 List of artificial objects on extraterrestrial surfaces
 List of artificial objects on Mars
 Mars Exploration Rover
 Mars flyby
 Mars landing
 Mars rover
 Satellites of Mars
 Timeline of Solar System exploration

References

 

Mars
 
Missions to Mars